Hoey Simon Lee,   is a Hong Kong academia, businessman and politician who is the chief strategy officer in the greater bay area at China Resources. He earned his Doctor of Juridical Science from the Tsinghua University Beijing in 2012, specializing in studying the Hong Kong Basic Law and the Hong Kong constitutional system. In 2021, he successfully ran in the election to the city's Legislative Council and was later sworn in as a member of the Legislative Council for the Election Committee constituency which was newly created under the electoral overhaul imposed by Beijing.

He serves as a member of the Basic Law Promotion Steering Committee, Convenor of the Working Group on Teachers and Students, and Chairperson for the standing committee on values education of the HKSAR Government. He received the Medal of Honor and the Justice of Peace from the HKSAR Government in 2016 and 2019 respectively. He was named the ‘Hong Kong Ten Outstanding Young Persons’ in 2017.

Electoral history

References 

Living people
Year of birth missing (living people)
HK LegCo Members 2022–2025
Members of the Election Committee of Hong Kong, 2021–2026
Hong Kong pro-Beijing politicians